Poverty Row is a slang term used to refer to Hollywood films produced from the 1920s to the 1950s by small (and mostly short-lived) B movie studios. Although many of them were based on (or near) today's Gower Street in Hollywood, the term did not necessarily refer to any specific physical location, but was rather a figurative catch-all for low-budget films produced by these lower-tier studios.

Many of the films of Poverty Row were Westerns, including series such as Billy the Kid, starring Buster Crabbe, from Producers Releasing Corporation (PRC), comedy/adventure series such as those featuring the Bowery Boys (Monogram Pictures) and detectives such as The Shadow. The films were characterized by low budgets, casts made up of minor stars or unknowns, and overall production values betraying the haste and economy with which they were made.

Studios 
While some Poverty Row studios had a brief existence, releasing only a few films, others operated on more-or-less the same terms as—if on a vastly different scale from—major film studios such as Metro-Goldwyn-Mayer, Warner Bros., and Paramount Pictures.

The most successful and longest-lived of such lower-tier companies maintained permanent lots (and many standing sets that dedicated moviegoers could frequently recognize), had both cast and crew on long-term contract, and had a more varied output than smaller firms.

Studios of this type 
 CBC Productions, founded by Harry Cohn, was considered a Poverty Row studio from 1919 until its reorganization in 1924 as Columbia Pictures.
 Tiffany Pictures was in operation from 1921 through 1932 as both a production company (about 90 films) and a distributor.
 Mascot Pictures was formed in 1927 by Nat Levine, and merged into Republic Pictures in 1935.
 Larry Darmour Productions flourished from 1927 through the 1930s, mainly on the popularity of its Mickey McGuire short film series starring Mickey Rooney. Darmour was also the principal producer within Majestic Pictures until 1935.
 Monogram Pictures was created in 1931 by the merger of Sono Art-World Wide Pictures with W. Ray Johnston's Rayart. After the attempted 1935 merger of Monogram into Republic Pictures, Johnston took Monogram independent again, and in the following decades produced everything from college/teen musicals starring popular swing bands to versions of classics such as Oliver Twist and the final films of Kay Francis. It evolved, in relatively good financial condition, into Allied Artists in 1953.
 Republic Pictures was organized in 1935 when Herbert J. Yates combined six other established Poverty Row companies, Monogram, Mascot Pictures, Liberty Pictures, Majestic Pictures, Chesterfield Pictures, and Invincible Films with his Consolidated Film Laboratories. Republic began by releasing serial shorts and Westerns with Gene Autry in the 1930s before eventually riding the success of eventual superstars Roy Rogers and John Wayne (the latter embarking on more ambitious projects, such as 1952's Wayne hit, The Quiet Man).
 Grand National Films Inc. was organized in 1936 with some significant talent (James Cagney and director Charles Lamont), but could not survive without its own distribution channel. It folded in 1939, having released about 100 films altogether.
 Producers Releasing Corporation (PRC) emerged in 1939 and lasted until 1946, when it was absorbed into Eagle-Lion Films. PRC presented a steady output of westerns, gangster movies, with occasional high spots, such as Edgar G. Ulmer's 1945 noir classic Detour and their 1944 Minstrel Man, the latter film was nominated for two Academy Awards.

Lower-tier studios 
The smallest studios, including Tiffany Pictures, Sam Katzman's Victory, Mascot and Chesterfield, often packaged and released films from independent producers, British "quota quickie" films, or borderline exploitation films such as Hitler, Beast of Berlin to supplement their own limited production capacity. Sometimes the same producers would found a new studio when the old one failed, such as Harry S. Webb and Bernard B. Ray's Reliable Pictures and Metropolitan Pictures.

Some organizations such as Astor Pictures and Realart Pictures began by obtaining the rights to re-release older films from other studios before producing their own films.

Comparison with other studios 

The Big Five majors
 Metro-Goldwyn-Mayer
 Paramount Pictures
 20th Century Fox
 Warner Bros.
 RKO Pictures (Dropped out of the majors, decades later)

The Little Three majors
 United Artists
 Columbia Pictures
 Universal Studios

Poverty Row (top four of many)
 Grand National
 Republic Pictures
 Monogram Pictures
 Producers Releasing Corporation (aka PRC)

Non-majors
 Walt Disney Studios (Animation studio only, became major studio decades later)
 Embassy Pictures
 London Films

Decline 
The breakup of the studio system (and its restrictive chain-theater distribution network, which left independent movie houses eager for seat-filling product from the Poverty Row studios) following 1948's United States v. Paramount Pictures, Inc. decision, and the advent of television were among the factors that led to the decline and ultimate disappearance of "Poverty Row" as a Hollywood phenomenon.

See also
 Independent film
 Vulgar auteurism
 Auteur theory
 Roger Corman
 French New Wave
 Classical Hollywood cinema
 Grindhouse

References

Further reading

 
 
 
 
 

Film and video terminology
Film production companies of the United States
History of Hollywood, Los Angeles
1920s in film
1930s in film
1940s in film
1950s in film
Film noir